Twee (Dutch for two) may refer to:

 Twee pop, a music genre
 Twee River, a river that forms the Groot River (Western Cape), South Africa

See also
 Twi, a dialect of the Akan language spoken in southern and central Ghana